All the Wrong Places is a 2000 American independent film directed by Martin Edwards. The film is a romantic comedy with actress Ali Hillis in the main role.

The plot follows Marissa (Ali Hillis) as she decides to become a filmmaker.

The film was shown at the 2000 Brooklyn Film Festival where the director tied with Wendy Jo Cohen for an award.

Cast
 Ali Hillis as Marisa Baron
 Jeremy Klavens as Paul Kelly
 Alyce LaTourelle as Melissa
 Brian Patrick Sullivan as Adam Kelly
 Ted Brunson as Tim Baron
 Brian Driscoll as Bill Banks
 Collette Porteous as Ruby
 Michele Carlo as Tricia (credited as Michelle Carlo)
 Stan Carp as The Cabbie
 Judy Del Giudice as Dr. Lamb (credited as Judy DelGiudice)
 Lilith Beitchman as Chloe

References

External links

2000 films
2000 romantic comedy films
American independent films
American romantic comedy films
2000 independent films
2000s English-language films
2000s American films